Eddie Hall vs. Hafþór Björnsson, also known as "The Heaviest Boxing Match in History", was a boxing match between strongmen Eddie Hall and Hafþór Björnsson that took place on 19th March 2022. Both have won the strongman competition "World's Strongest Man" owned by IMG Worldwide. Prior to Hall's injury, the match was set to take place on September 18, 2021 at VyStar Veterans Memorial Arena in Jacksonville, Florida. The replacement match in September 2021 was between Björnsson and Devon Larratt in Dubai while the match against Hall was rescheduled to March 19, 2022.

Hall started the first round with continuous haymakers but Björnsson kept his composure and stuck to the basics, focusing on a solid jab and better footwork. Once Björnsson realized Hall's game plan, he took control of the fight by bludgeoning and knocking down Hall twice to the floor in rounds three and six. Hall sustained bleeding lacerations on top of both eyes and Björnsson won the fight via unanimous decision, having won all but the second round.

Background 
The fight was announced in November 2020.

Both Hall and Björnsson went into the fight with numerous accolades in strength athletics. Hall holds the title of 2017 World's Strongest Man and won UK's Strongest Man and Britain's Strongest Man multiple times. Björnsson holds the title of 2018 World's Strongest Man and has placed in the top three positions of the competition every year since 2012. He is also the 2018 World's Ultimate Strongman, 3 times in a row Arnold Strongman Classic champion, 5 times Europe's Strongest Man, 8 times Strongman Champions League champion, 9 times Giants Live champion, and 15 times Iceland’s Strongest Man and Strongest Man in Iceland champion. 

In 2016, Hall set a world record in deadlifting with 500 kg (~1102 lbs) at the 2016 Europe's Strongest Man competition. However, Björnsson deadlifted 501 kg (~1105 lbs) at the 2020 World's Ultimate Strongman - Feats of Strength series and established the current world record.

On 26th July 2021 an announcement was made that Hall had suffered an injury and therefore the fight would be postponed. Devon Larratt was chosen as the replacement for Hall for the September 18 match to be held in Dubai. Björnsson defeated Larratt in the first round by technical knockout.

References 

2021 in boxing
2021 in sports in Florida
Crossover boxing events
September 2021 sports events in the United States
Simulcasts
Sports competitions in Jacksonville, Florida